Spatalistis hormota is a species of moth of the family Tortricidae. It is found in India (Assam).

The wingspan is 15–17 mm. The forewings are light ochreous-yellowish, finely strigulated with deeper ochreous and with a slender slightly incurved deep yellow-ochreous streak, sometimes sprinkled with a few dark fuscous points, from the apex of the wing to two-thirds of the dorsum, continued along the dorsum to near the base. The hindwings are whitish-ochreous, posteriorly broadly suffused with fuscous-ochreous and with the apex more fuscous.

References

Moths described in 1907
hormota
Moths of Asia
Taxa named by Edward Meyrick